Milutin Kërçiç (born 1958) is an Albanian footballer. He played in one match for the Albania national football team in 1983.

References

External links
 

1958 births
Living people
Albanian footballers
Albania international footballers
Place of birth missing (living people)
Association footballers not categorized by position